Lisandra Rodriguez (born 14 October 1986) is a Cuban female discus thrower, who won an individual gold medal at the Youth World Championships.

References

External links

1986 births
Living people
Cuban female discus throwers
21st-century Cuban women